Engin Arık (October 14, 1948 – November 30, 2007) was a Turkish particle physicist and professor at Boğaziçi University. Arik represented Turkey at the Comprehensive Nuclear Test Ban Treaty Organization. She was known for her support of Thorium as an energy source and for the full membership of Turkey at CERN. Arik died in the Atlasjet Flight 4203 crash on November 30, 2007.

Education 
Arik graduated from Istanbul University in 1969 with a BSc in physics and mathematics. As a graduate student, Arik attended University of Pittsburgh where she earned a master's degree in 1971 and a PhD in 1976 in experimental high energy physics, where she worked on the E583 experiment at Brookhaven National Laboratory. Arik's thesis was titled "Inclusive lambda production in sigma minus - proton collisions at 23 GeV/c." Following her PhD, Arik went to University of London, Westfield College for postdoctoral work. Here she worked in high energy physics research being carried out at the Rutherford Laboratory and later at the CERN Laboratory.

Career 
In 1979, Arik returned to Turkey and joined the Department of Physics at Boğaziçi University, first as a lecturer, then in 1981 as an associate professor. In 1983, Arik briefly left her position at the university to work in industry with Control Data Corporation. Arik would return to Boğaziçi University in 1985 and in 1988, she received a full professorship.

While teaching at Boğaziçi University, Arik performed research in the field of high energy physics. Her work faced limitations due to a scarcity of resources in Turkey available for this area of research. In the beginning of the 1990s, Arik joined experiments at CERN as a collaborator. Experiments she was a part of include: CHARM II, CHORUS, Spin Muon Collaboration (SMC), ATLAS, and CERN Axion Solar Telescope (CAST). During her career, Arik was a supporter of a movement for Turkey to become a full member of CERN as opposed to an associate member.

From 1997 to 2000, Arik was appointed to represent Turkey at the Comprehensive Nuclear Test Ban Treaty Organization, which was held at the headquarters of the International Atomic Energy Agency (IAEA) in Vienna, Austria. During this time, Arik commuted between Geneva, Istanbul and Vienna. Arik spoke often about the use of Thorium as an energy source in a new generation of Nuclear Power Plants, calling it "the most strategic material of the 21st century."

Throughout her career, Arik published more than 100 studies in the fields of experimental high energy physics, detectors, Nuclear Physics applications, and mathematical physics.

Death and legacy 

Arık died in the Atlasjet Flight 4203 crash on November 30, 2007. She was traveling with two students and three colleagues to Isparta, Turkey for the fourth workshop on a potential Turkish particle accelerator design.

Following Arik's death, a fellowship at CERN was established in her memory. The Engin Arik Fellowship funds Turkish students to join CERN's Summer Student Program, with selection being merit-based. Funding for the fellowship was provided by institutes, individuals, and private businesses.

The International Conference on Particle Physics, held at Boğaziçi University in Istanbul from October 27–31, 2008, was organized in memory of Arik and her colleagues.

A street was named after Arik in the İlkyerleşim neighborhood of the Yenimahalle district in Ankara, Turkey.

References

External links 
Publications list
Scientific publications of Engin Arık on INSPIRE-HEP

1948 births
2007 deaths
Alumni of Westfield College
Academic staff of Boğaziçi University
People associated with CERN
Istanbul University alumni
Turkish nuclear physicists
University of Pittsburgh alumni
Victims of aviation accidents or incidents in Turkey
Women nuclear physicists
20th-century non-fiction writers
Turkish women scientists